Huatugou or Huatugouzhen (literally: Huatugou Town) is a town in Mangnai, Haixi, Qinghai, China.

Huatugou Airport is located nearby.

References

Cities in Qinghai
Township-level divisions of Qinghai
Haixi Mongol and Tibetan Autonomous Prefecture